Patricia Pearson (born April 7, 1964) is a Canadian writer and journalist. She has published two novels and several works of nonfiction.

Life and work
Born in Mexico City, Pearson is one of five children of Canadian diplomat Geoffrey Pearson and former Ontario Senator Landon Pearson, and the granddaughter of former Prime Minister Lester Pearson. She was educated at Netherwood School in Rothesay, New Brunswick; Trinity College, Toronto; the University of Chicago; and Columbia School of Journalism in New York.

Pearson has written for magazines such as The New Yorker, Toronto Life, Reader's Digest and Business Week. Her newspaper work has appeared in The Globe and Mail, The Toronto Star, The New York Times, National Post, The Guardian, and The Daily Telegraph. She's also written for CBC Television, The History Channel and TVOntario.

Pearson resigned her weekly column  at the National Post in 2003 to protest that newspaper's support for the Bush administration in the lead-up to the Iraq war. Her subsequent satirical writing has been hailed as "hysterically funny" by the Los Angeles Times and “highly amusing” by the New York Times. 
 
Pearson has lived in New York City, Delhi and Moscow, and now resides in Toronto, Ontario with her husband and two children.

Bibliography

Novels
 Playing House (Random House of Canada, 2003)
 Believe Me (Random House of Canada, 2005)

Non-fiction
 When She Was Bad: How and Why Women Get Away with Murder (1998) Viking USA, Virago UK, Random House Canada
 Area Woman Blows Gasket: Tales from the Domestic Frontier (2005) Vintage Canada
 A Brief History of Anxiety (Yours & Mine) (Bloomsbury, 2008)
 Opening Heaven's Door: What the Dying May Be Trying to Tell Us About Where They're Going (Random House, 2014)  (reprinted as Opening Heaven's Door: What the Dying Are Trying to Say about Where They're Going)
 Looks Can Kill: A Doctor's Journey Through Steroids, Addiction and Online Fitness Culture (with Riam Shaamaa) (Random House Canada, 2020} 
 Wish You Were Here: A Murdered Girl, a Brother's Quest and the Hunt for a Serial Killer (with John Allore) (Random House, 2020)

Articles

Awards
 1994 National Magazine Award (Honourable mention, Science, Health and Medicine category, for "Murder on her Mind")
 1995 National Magazine Award (Gold, Essay category, for "Behind Every Successful Psychopath")
 1998 National Magazine Award (Gold, One-of-a-kind Articles category, for "Death Becomes Her")
 1996 National Author's Award
 1997 Arthur Ellis Award for best non-fiction crime book
 2004 Stephen Leacock Memorial Medal for Humour, finalist

References

External links

Audio interview re: A Brief History of Anxiety May 2008

1964 births
Living people
Canadian women journalists
Canadian women non-fiction writers
Journalists from Toronto
Writers from Mexico City
Writers from Toronto
Trinity College (Canada) alumni
University of Toronto alumni
Patricia
University of Chicago alumni
Columbia University Graduate School of Journalism alumni